Pablo Mascareñas (born 4 August 1989) is a Mexican professional footballer who plays as midfielder for Ascenso MX club Oaxaca.

Career

Altamira 
Mascareñas was born in Ciudad Madero, Tamaulipas. He made his professional debut with Altamira in the Ascenso MX in 2010. He appeared with the team in Liga MX and in the Copa MX. His best season came in 2011–12, scoring two goals in two games for the team.

Ciudad Madeiro
Mascareñas had the best season of his career on loan with the third division team in the 2012–13 season, scoring 13 goals in 17 games.

Atlas
Mascareñas signed with Atlas on 14 July, making appearances for the team in the Copa MX during the 2014–15 season.

Alebrijes de Oaxaca
Mascareñas signed for Oaxaca for the Clausura 2016 in the Ascenso MX. Oaxaca finished in 3rd place in the Apertura 2015 and were eliminated by future runner up Atlante F.C. 4–3 on aggregate.

References

1989 births
Living people
Footballers from Tamaulipas
Association football midfielders
Mexican footballers